Trevor's World of Sport began as a 2003 BBC television sitcom written and directed by Andy Hamilton and starring Neil Pearson as Trevor. One series of the television series was made, followed by three series which were aired on BBC Radio 4, as a continuation of the television series.

Cast
 Neil Pearson as Trevor Heslop
 Paul Reynolds as Sammy Dobbs
 Rosalind Ayres as Theresa
 Abdul Salis as Barry
 Cosima Shaw as Heidrun
 Michael Fenton Stevens as Ralph Renton
 Claire Skinner as Meryl

Plot
The series is set in the world of TS Sports – a sports public relations firm, run by Trevor Heslop and his partner, the lascivious Sammy Dobbs (Paul Reynolds). Trevor is portrayed as an essentially decent, honest man in the corrupt money-obsessed industry of sporting celebrity, who is still deeply in love with his estranged wife Meryl (Claire Skinner). The other TS Sports office staff are the cool German receptionist Heidrun (Cosima Shaw), whose lesbianism obsesses Sammy; the young black trainee Barry (Abdul Salis); and strongly Christian office manager Theresa (Rosalind Ayres).

Andy Hamilton also appears in a minor role within the show, and several actors who have worked in his other comedy shows for television and radio appear. Neil Pearson was in Hamilton's Drop the Dead Donkey, as (briefly) was Michael Fenton Stevens who plays TS Sports' only regular client, fading celebrity Ralph Renton.

Episodes

The television series

The radio series
Series 1

Series 2

Series 3

Television Rescheduling
Only one television series was made, and Hamilton felt mistreated by the BBC over the scheduling of the show. The first episode attracted an average of 3.4 million viewers, dropping to 2.9 million for the second and third episodes. The subsequent episodes were rescheduled from Friday evenings (just after the 9:00pm watershed) to Monday nights (after the 10:00pm news), despite the Radio Times issues having already been published listing the originally scheduled transmission dates. Hamilton went public with his displeasure over the show's scheduling and vowed never to work for BBC1 again, though he has since changed his mind. A radio version was first broadcast on BBC Radio 4 in 2004, with subsequent series in 2005 and 2007.

DVD release
The complete television series was released on DVD by Acorn Media UK on 6 May 2013.

References

External links

BBC Comedy Guide to this show

BBC television sitcoms
BBC Radio comedy programmes
2003 British television series debuts
2003 British television series endings
2000s British sitcoms
2004 radio programme debuts
2007 radio programme endings
Television series based on radio series
Television series by Hat Trick Productions
English-language television shows
English-language radio programs
2000s British sports television series